Abhoy Negi (born 18 October 1992) is an Indian cricketer. He made his Twenty20 debut for Tripura in the 2017–18 Zonal T20 League on 12 January 2018.

References

External links
 

1992 births
Living people
Indian cricketers
Tripura cricketers
Place of birth missing (living people)